Bhainsdehi tehsil is a fourth-order administrative and revenue division, a subdivision of third-order administrative and revenue division of Betul district of Madhya Pradesh.

Geography
Bhainsdehi tehsil has an area of 786.18 sq kilometers. It is bounded by Harda district in the northwest and north, Chicholi tehsil in the northeast, Betul tehsil in the east, Athner tehsil in the southeast, Maharashtra in the south and southwest and Khandwa district in the west.

See also 
Betul district

References

Tehsils of Madhya Pradesh
Betul district